is a UK labour law case, concerning wrongful dismissal.

Facts
Mr Edwards was dismissed from his surgeon job for ‘gross misconduct’ without having his contractual disciplinary procedure followed for alleged impropriety toward a female patient. The contract also said “the employment is subject to three months’ notice on either side”. The General Medical Council summarily dismissed his appeal. He claimed £3.8m in lost earnings and damage to reputation, arguing that if the procedure were proper, by having a lawyer and someone from his department on the panel, the allegations would not have been established against him, and his career would not have been wrecked. The GMC, however, did not prevent him continuing to work. The judge held that damages could not exceed the earnable income in the notice period, plus the period that a disciplinary procedure would last, and further damages were excluded by Johnson for the manner of the dismissal. The Court of Appeal held Mr Edwards could recover full damages for breach of express contractual disciplinary proceedings, and Johnson v Unisys Ltd only precludes a term being implied at common law for the manner of dismissal. Moore-Bick LJ ‘in cases where the claimant relies on the common law implied term it will sometimes be necessary to determine whether the act relied on formed part of the process of dismissal or preceded it. The need for that inquiry does not arise, however, in a case where the employee relies on an express term of the contract and accordingly in such cases the Johnson exclusion area is not a relevant concept.’ Ward LJ and Lloyd LJ concurred.

The case was joined to Botham v Ministry of Defence. Mr Botham was a youth community worker in Germany till he was dismissed by the MoD for gross misconduct for inappropriate behaviour with two teenage girls in September 2003. He was placed on a list of people unsuitable to work with children under the Protection of Children Act 1999, and not removed until July 2007. He claimed unfair dismissal. The Tribunal found he was unfairly dismissed, and was awarded the maximum, his name removed from the register. He then claimed damages for breach of contract in the High Court. Slade J in the High Court held that he could not recover damages, because it related to the manner of dismissal. Pill LJ approved an appeal, because of the Edwards case, and gave permission to go to the Supreme Court.

Judgment
The Supreme Court held (Lady Hale, Lord Kerr and Lord Wilson dissenting) that neither Mr Edwards, nor Mr Botham, could claim more loss than would be available in an unfair dismissal claim. Breach of a disciplinary rule counted to the fairness of a dismissal in ERA 1996, and that was so during the EA 2002 and EA 2008 amendments. Parliament's enactment of unfair dismissal legislation, which was less generous than the common law, precluded any claim for damages relating to the manner of dismissal, whether formulated as either an express or an implied term. An employee could seek an injunction to halt the threatened breach of contract, however, as it still plainly remained a breach of contract.

Lord Dyson and Lord Walker said the following.

Lord Phillips gave a short speech.

Lady Hale said the following.

Lord Mance agreed with Lord Dyson.

Lord Kerr (and Lord Wilson concurring) would have held that Mr Edwards should succeed in his claim, but because Mr Botham's reputational damage was inextricably linked to the manner of his dismissal, he could not have a successful claim.

See also

UK labour law

Notes

References

United Kingdom labour case law
Supreme Court of the United Kingdom cases
2011 in British law
2011 in case law